"Go" is the debut single recorded by British singer Delilah. The song was released as a digital download single on 6 September 2011 in the United Kingdom from her debut album From the Roots Up. Delilah featured on Chase & Status's hit "Time" earlier this year, which reached number 21 on the UK Singles Chart.

The song features lyrics from the 1983 Chaka Khan hit, "Ain't Nobody" ("The next thing I felt was you / Holding me close / What am I gonna do? / I let myself go"). In an interview with Pyromag in September 2011, Delilah mentioned that Chaka Khan has heard the track and thought it was "genius".

Music video
A music video to accompany the release of "Go" was first released onto YouTube on 1 September 2011 at a total length of three minutes and forty-seven seconds. The music video was filmed in the Whitechapel district of London.

Track listing

Charts

Weekly charts

Year-end charts

Certifications

Release history

References

2011 debut singles
Delilah (musician) songs
2011 songs
Songs written by Hawk Wolinski
Songs written by Delilah (musician)
Warner Music Group singles